Line 20 will be a future subway line on the Shanghai Metro. It will run in an east–west direction in northern Shanghai, connecting Shanghai West railway station in Jiading District to Gongqing Forest Park in Yangpu District, with a possible future extension to Zhouhai Road in northern Pudong. The line was announced by the Municipal government in 2016.

History

Stations

References

Shanghai Metro lines
Proposed buildings and structures in Shanghai
Shanghai
2025 in rail transport